Lorena Llamas García (born 28 October 1987) is a Spanish former professional racing cyclist, who rode professionally between 2016 and 2019 for the  and  squads.

See also
 List of 2016 UCI Women's Teams and riders

References

External links
 

1987 births
Living people
Spanish female cyclists
People from Igualada
Sportspeople from the Province of Barcelona
Cyclists from Catalonia
21st-century Spanish women